Lwin Moe Aung (born 10 December 1999) is a Burmese professional footballer who plays as an attacking midfielder for Thai League 2 club Rayong and the Myanmar national football team.
He is the youngest football player in the Myanmar football team for the SEA Games. He won the Best Male Youth Player Award at the 2018 Myanmar National League (MNL) Awards.

Club

Early life
Lwin Moe Aung was born on 10 December 1999 in Thayet Tan village, Amarapura, Mandalay Region. He is the second child of three and he has one older sister and one younger brother. His father is a mushroom trader. He was crazy about football when he was young. He began joining local amateur football competitions that were held annually near Paleik Pagoda close to his village. He studied in Sports and Physical Sciences Institution, Mandalay.

Career
Lwin Moe Aung played in midfield when he arrived at the Sports and Physical Sciences Institution. As he was having difficulties playing in midfield, he tried to get a chance to play on the right-wing, but the manager persuaded him to stay in the midfield, so he remained a midfielder.

In 2017, he was selected to play for the national youth team. Because of his talent, he was selected for the U-23 side even though he was playing for the U-18 team at the time. Then head coach Gerd Zeise chose him for the first time for the match against Kyrgyzstan, played in South Korea, as the final match of 2019 AFC Asian Cup.

In 2018 December, Ayeyawady United signed Lwin Myo Aung from I.S.P.E. He plays 37 international matches, scoring 5 goals for Myanmar U20. The young attacking midfielder proves that he has the capability to distribute from a more advanced position, especially in creating danger for his side.

Lwin Moe Aung joined Yangon United on a two-year loan deal. However, the loan contract was eventually terminated and he did not make a single appearance. He is currently a free agent.

Club

International

Individual
 Ayeyawady United
 MNL The Best Male Youth Player Award : 2018

 Rayong  M-150 Thai League 2 Man Of the Month : January'''

References

1999 births
Living people
Burmese footballers
Myanmar international footballers
Ayeyawady United F.C. players
Association football fullbacks
Competitors at the 2019 Southeast Asian Games
Southeast Asian Games medalists in football
Southeast Asian Games bronze medalists for Myanmar
Competitors at the 2021 Southeast Asian Games